Prakash Man Singh is a Nepalese politician and a leader of the Nepali Congress. He is the son of political stalwart Ganesh Man Singh. He has also served as the Deputy Prime Minister and Minister of Local Development and Federalism in Sushil Koirala's Cabinet.

Political career 
Singh contested the Kathmandu-4 constituency in the 1991 parliamentary election. Singh got 36.13% of the votes in the constituency, but was defeated by Sahana Pradhan of the Communist Party of Nepal (United Marxist-Leninist) (CPN(UML)).

In the 1994 parliamentary election, he contested the Kathmandu-3 constituency. Singh got 33.77% of the votes in the constituency, but was defeated by the CPN(UML) candidate Manmohan Adhikari.

Singh was Minister for Population and Environment in Sher Bahadur Deuba's cabinet formed in 1996. He later became Minister for Supplies in Krishna Prasad Bhattarai's cabinet.

In the split in the Nepali Congress, Singh sided with the break-away Nepali Congress (Democratic). Singh became vice-president of NC(D). Singh also became Minister for Physical Planning and Construction in Sher Bahadur Deuba's cabinet.

Singh was removed from his ministerial position when King Gyanendra grabbed power in February 2005. In February 2005, Singh was arrested for two weeks. Singh was again arrested on April 21, 2005, after refusing to appear for a hearing of the Royal Commission for Corruption Control. Singh, along with Sher Bahadur Deuba, were accused by the RCCC of involvement in a case of corruption relating to the Melamchi Drinking Water Project. Singh had refused to appear in front of the RCCC, as he considering the institution as unconstitutional. In July 2005, Singh and Deuba were sentenced to 2 year in jail and a fine of 90 million rupees. Singh was released from jail on February 13, 2006, as the Supreme Court of Nepal ordered the dissolution of the RCCC.

After the fall of King Gyanendra's direct rule, Singh became a nominated member of the new interim legislature.

After the reunification of NC and NC(D), Singh became vice president of Nepali Congress.

In 2008, he won the Kathmandu-1 seat in the Constituent Assembly election, being the first candidate to be declared a winner. Singh obtained 14318 votes.

In the 12th General convention of the Party held on September 22, 2010, Singh was elected as General Secretary of the Party defeating rival candidate Bimalendra Nidhi from Deuba Camp.

Singh, the son of Ganesh Man Singh fielded candidacy for the post of party president leaving the camp in the 14th general convention of Nepali Congress. He was able to garner nearly 7% voters opening the way for second round of election as Deuba who obtained 48% votes was unable to cross 50% mark even joining hands with leader Krishna Prasad Sitaula. Later, Deuba asked Nidhi and Singh for support while Singh said he was ready to support Deuba. With this, Deuba and Singh came together after almost 12 years.

Electoral history

2017 legislative elections

2013 Constituent Assembly election

2008 Constituent Assembly election

1994 legislative elections

1991 legislative elections

References

Living people
Nepali Congress politicians from Bagmati Province
Nepali Congress (Democratic) politicians
Government ministers of Nepal
1956 births
People from Kathmandu
Nepal MPs 2017–2022
Deputy Prime Ministers of Nepal
Members of the 1st Nepalese Constituent Assembly
Members of the 2nd Nepalese Constituent Assembly
Members of the National Assembly (Nepal)
Nepal MPs 2022–present